Sony Xperia E4 is an Android based smartphone manufactured by Sony Mobile Communications. It is a budget oriented mid-range device with 5" qHD IPS display, a 5 megapixel camera and a 2MP front camera with automatic scene recognition. Like other Sony phones, the E4 has its own OmniBalance dual-layered design. The outermost layer has its own body and the glass screen part has its own division which is enclosed by the outermost layer. The Sony Xperia E4 is a mid range Android smartphone designed and manufactured by Sony. It was announced in February 2015. The Xperia E4 has a dual SIM variant named the Xperia E4 Dual and the Xperia E4 has a kind of LTE Successor which is the Sony Xperia E4g.

Hardware
The Xperia E4 features a 5-inch display with a resolution of qHD IPS. It has a 5 megapixels camera capable of HDR pictures. On the inside, the Xperia E4 features a 1.3 GHz quad-core MediaTek processor, a 2,300mAh Li-Ion battery, 1GB of RAM, 8GB of internal storage and microSD support up to 32GB. Weighing 144g, the device measures 137 x 74.6 x 10.5 mm. The phone includes an FM Radio and, for connectivity, Bluetooth 4.1.

Due to the phone itself being Entertainment centric, the Xperia E4 includes a tons of applications including Walkman, PartyShare, xLoud, Clear Audio+ and Camera apps found on the software of the phone.

Software
The Xperia E4 comes with Sony's Timescape UI (or Xperia UI) and Google's Android 4.4.4 KitKat with some notable applications additions such as Sony's Media applications (Walkman, Album and Videos). Additionally, the device also includes Sony's battery stamina mode which increases the phone's standby time up to 4 times and Ultra Stamina Mode which they advertise to have up to 2 days of battery life with mid usage. Several Google applications (such as Google Chrome, Google Play, Google Voice Search, Google Search, Google Maps for Mobile with Street view and Latitude, Google Talk application) also come preinstalled with the device.

There has been no news on Android 5.0 Lollipop to be released for this device.

Issues
The Xperia E4 experienced an software glitch where the device will not respond to clicks from the physical power button. This software glitch has still not been resolved and only affects a few devices.

Other problems were experienced by some Xperia E4 users who complained that their device battery life drained too quickly despite stamina mode being enabled. To resolve the issue the device had to be soft (factory) reset by the user.

References

See also 
 Sony Xperia

Android (operating system) devices
Sony smartphones